Peziza is a large genus of saprophytic cup fungi that grow on the ground, rotting wood, or dung. Most members of this genus are of unknown edibility and are difficult to identify as separate species without use of microscopy. The polyphyletic genus has been estimated to contain over 100 species.

Species
Species include:
 Peziza ampliata
 Peziza arvernensis
 Peziza badia
 Peziza cerea
 Peziza domiciliana
 Peziza echinospora
 Peziza erini
 Peziza fimeti
 Peziza granulosa
 Peziza halophila
 Peziza infossa
 Peziza micropus group
 Peziza moseri 
 Peziza oliviae
 Peziza ostracoderma
 Peziza petersii
 Peziza phyllogena
 Peziza praetervisa
 Peziza repanda
 Peziza succosa
 Peziza sylvestris
 Peziza varia
 Peziza vesiculosa
 Peziza violacea

References

External links
 Photos of a few Peziza species
 Photos of a few Peziza species

Pezizales genera
Pezizaceae